Comair Flight 3272 was a Comair flight from Cincinnati to Detroit on Thursday, January 9, 1997. All 29 aboard, 26 passengers and three crew members, were killed.

The cause of the crash was determined to be inadequate and out of date flight crew procedures for icing conditions. Some of these originated with the Federal Aviation Administration's failure to specify suitable minimum airspeeds for icing conditions, while some were Comair procedure manual defects, including superseded instructions on the use of de-icing boots that did not follow the aircraft manufacturer's instructions.

Passengers and crew
There were 26 passengers on board the Embraer 120, registered as N265CA. There were two crew members in the cockpit and a flight attendant in the cabin. The captain was Dann Carlsen, age 42, who was the pilot monitoring (PM). He had 5,329 flight hours, including 1,097 hours on the EMB-120. The first officer was Kenneth Reece, age 29, who was the Pilot Flying (PF) on Flight 3272. Reece had 2,582 flight hours, with 1,494 of them on the EMB-120.

Accident 
Flight 3272 took off from Cincinnati/Northern Kentucky International Airport at 14:53. Less than an hour later, the pilots began the approach to Detroit Metropolitan Wayne County Airport.

About 45 seconds later, the pilots were instructed to turn left onto a heading of 090 degrees to intercept the localizer. During the turn, Captain Carlsen made the statement "Yeah, looks like your low speed indicator," and asked First Officer Reece for increased power to the engines. Almost immediately, the aircraft abruptly stalled. It violently rolled 145 degrees to the left, to the right, and back to the left again. The pilots lost control, and Flight 3272 crashed into a rural field in Raisinville Township in  killing all 29 aboard.

Aftermath
The National Transportation Safety Board very quickly has noticed similarities between this accident and American Eagle Flight 4184. The NTSB determined that the probable cause was inadequate standards for icing operations while in flight, specifically the failure of the Federal Aviation Administration to establish adequate minimum airspeeds for icing conditions, leading to a loss of control when the airplane accumulated a thin, rough accretion of ice on its lifting surfaces.

A contributing factor was the crew's decision to operate in icing conditions while near the lower end of the flight envelope while the flaps were retracted. Comair had not established unambiguous minimum airspeed values for flap configurations and for flight in icing conditions. They also, against recommendation of the plane's manufacturer, failed to activate the deicing boots on the wings. This was because the Comair Flight manual recommendation was in contravention of the manufacturers due to a concern over "ice bridging", a concern held over from older planes that was no longer valid on newer generation planes like the Embraer 120.

As the plane crash site is on private property, a memorial was built at the Roselawn Memorial Park in La Salle, Michigan, where unidentified remains of those killed in the crash are buried.

Dramatization
The investigation into the crash was covered in "Deadly Myth", a 2017 episode of Mayday, a Canadian television series about air crashes.

See also 
 List of accidents and incidents involving commercial aircraft
 Aviation safety

References

External links 
 
 NTSB Aircraft Accident Safety Report
Appendix C
Appendix D
Appendix E
Appendix F
Appendix G
Appendix H
Appendix I
NTSB investigation docket
 Strangers united in death - The Cincinnati Enquirer (Listing of passengers on the flights)

Airliner accidents and incidents in Michigan
Airliner accidents and incidents caused by ice
1997 in Michigan
3272
Disasters in Michigan
Accidents and incidents involving the Embraer EMB 120 Brasilia
Monroe County, Michigan
Aviation accidents and incidents in the United States in 1997
January 1997 events in the United States
Airliner accidents and incidents caused by stalls